Rogów  is a settlement in the administrative district of Gmina Stepnica, within Goleniów County, West Pomeranian Voivodeship, in north-western Poland.

References

Villages in Goleniów County